Seriously Single is a 2020 South African film directed by Katleho Ramaphakela and Rethabile Ramaphakela, written by Lwazi Mvusi and starring Fulu Mugovhani, Tumi Morake and Bohang Moeko.

Cast

Release
Seriously Single was released on July 31, 2020 on Netflix.

References

External links
 
 
 

2020 films
2020s English-language films
English-language South African films
Zulu-language films
Afrikaans-language films
Tswana-language films
English-language Netflix original films